Świdnik is a village in the administrative district of Gmina Marciszów, within Kamienna Góra County, Lower Silesian Voivodeship, in south-western Poland.

The village has a total area of .103 km2.

Notable residents
 Winfried Baumgart (born 1938), German historian

References

Villages in Kamienna Góra County